Tanakia signifer is a species of ray-finned fish in the genus Tanakia.

References

Tanakia
Taxa named by Lev Berg
Fish described in 1907